The Connacht Football Association is the governing body for association football in the Irish province of Connacht. It is affiliated to the Football Association of Ireland and is currently responsible for organizing the Connacht Junior Cup and four junior leagues – the Galway & District League, the Mayo Association Football League, the Roscommon and District Football League and the Sligo/Leitrim & District League as well as numerous other leagues and cup competitions for junior teams. In the past it has also been responsible for organizing the Connacht Senior Cup and the Connacht Senior League. However both of these competitions are currently inactive.

Cup competitions
 Connacht Junior Cup 
 Michael Byrne Cup
 Connacht Senior Cup
 Connacht Senior League Challenge Cup

Affiliated leagues
 Galway & District League 
 Mayo Association Football League 
 Roscommon and District Football League 
 Sligo/Leitrim & District League
 Mayo Women's Football League
 Connacht Senior League

Representative team
A Connacht representative team competes in the FAI Intermediate Interprovincial Tournament against teams representing the Ulster Senior League, the Leinster Senior League and Munster Senior League.

See also
 Irish Universities Football Union
 Leinster Football Association
 Munster Football Association
 Women's Football Association of Ireland
 Galway Football Association

References 

 
Connacht
Football